Elize du Toit (born 21 February 1980) is a South African-born English actress best known for playing the role of Izzy Davies in the Channel 4 soap opera Hollyoaks from 2000 to 2004, with a brief return in 2007.

Early life
Elize du Toit was born in Grahamstown, South Africa, the second of four children, to an artist mother and an orthodontist father. She spent most of her childhood in Pretoria. She moved to Berkshire, United Kingdom, in December 1994, where she attended Wellington College, completed her A-levels; attaining straight As in English, French, history and history of art. She was a member of Reading's Progress Theatre. She studied history at the University of Edinburgh and performed with the Edinburgh University Theatre Company.

Career
Elize du Toit won the role of Izzy Davies in the Channel 4 Soap Opera Hollyoaks after an open audition; beating 40,000 hopefuls. She left the show in 2004 after four years filming in Liverpool. In November 2011, Du Toit made an appearance in Coronation Street as Jenny, the ex-girlfriend of Matt Carter.

Personal life
In 2008, du Toit started dating actor Rafe Spall after the two met in a bar through mutual friends. The couple got married on 14 August 2010, and live in West Kensington, London. Their daughter was born in 2011, and, in November 2012, their son was born. They also have a third child, another son, born in 2015.

Filmography

References

External links

http://www.elizedutoit.com/public/ Official Website

1981 births
Living people
People from Makhanda, Eastern Cape
People educated at Wellington College, Berkshire
English television actresses
English soap opera actresses
Alumni of the University of Edinburgh
South African emigrants to the United Kingdom